Chawnghlut Lalrosanga (born 24 October 1992) is an Indian professional footballer who plays as a midfielder for Aizawl FC in the I-League.

Career 
He made his professional debut for the Aizawl against Gokulam Kerala F.C. on 31 December 2017, He was brought in as substitute in the 88th minute as Aizawl won 0–2.

Career statistics

References

1992 births
Living people
People from Mizoram
Indian footballers
Aizawl FC players  
Footballers from Mizoram
I-League players
Association football midfielders
Chanmari FC players
Mizoram Premier League players